Zaosinovo is a rural locality (a village) in Kondratovskoye Rural Settlement, Permsky District, Perm Krai, Russia. The population was 156 as of 2010.

Geography 
Zaosinovo is located 17 km west of Perm (the district's administrative centre) by road. Bereg Kamy is the nearest rural locality.

References 

Rural localities in Permsky District